Istanbul Girls' High School was the first state established girls school in the Ottoman Empire.

The school was inaugurated on March 21, 1850, by Sadrazam Mustafa Reshid Pasha, one of the architects of the Tanzimat reforms, in a building donated by Bezmiâlem Sultan, mother of Sultan Abdulmejid I. At the beginning, it was a secondary school. The school took the name İnas İdadisi (Girls Lycee) in 1911, and later İnas Sultanisi (Imperial High School for Girls).

During most of the republican period in Turkey, the school was known under the name İstanbul Kız Lisesi, but always related to its founding mother Bezm-i Alem, whose name it carried officially as Bezm-i Alem Sultanisi for about a decade until 1924, when it was renamed.

The school could not be spared from a spree of closing (or turning into a mixed gender school), similar to what other girls-only schools also experienced in Turkey in the early 1980s. It ceased receiving new students in 1984, had its final graduates in 1988, and then closed down. At its closure, its building became Cağaloğlu Anatolian High School.

See also 
 Education in the Ottoman Empire

External links 
 Alumni association

See also
 Cağaloğlu Anadolu Lisesi

High schools in Istanbul
Educational institutions established in 1850
1850 establishments in the Ottoman Empire
Defunct schools in Turkey
Fatih
Girls' schools in Turkey
1983 disestablishments in Turkey